Wilcocks is a surname. Notable people with the surname include:

Alexander Wilcocks (1741—1801), American lawyer and Revolutionary War supporter
Joseph Wilcocks (1673–1756), British Anglican bishop
Philip Wilcocks (born 1953), British Royal Navy admiral

See also
Willcocks
Wilcox